College Girl is a 1960 Hindi black-and-white romantic family film written by K. A. Narayan and directed by T. Prakash Rao. The film starred Shammi Kapoor, Vyjayanthimala in the lead with Om Prakash, Tabassum, Nana Palsikar, Raj Mehra, Purnima, Randhir, Achala Sachdev, Leela Mishra, Mohan Choti forming an ensemble cast. The film was produced by B. L. Rawal under his own banner, Rawal Films. The film's score was composed by duo Shankar-Jaikishan with lyrics provided by Rajendra Krishan, edited by Pran Mehra and was filmed by Dharam Chopra.

Plot
In India, girls from their very birth are taken for a liability upon their parents; thus the mothers of the nation are looked down on in their own homes. Kamala represents such afflicted Indian girlhood. She is the daughter of Judge Ram Pershad who is illiterate and has orthodox views about girls. She stands first in the Matriculation Examination and has an ardent desire for studying in college in order to become a doctor. Judge Ram Pershad is totally against college education for girls. It is his faith that any money spent on the sons alone is money well-spent merely because they are sons and will stand by him in his old age. Kamala is determined not to bow before injustice, but to secure her rightful place in society. She makes an all-out bid to join college with the contrivance of Dr. Ratanlal, a close friend of her father. In college, she comes across Shyam, who helps her in many difficult situations.

Cast
 Shammi Kapoor as Shyam
 Vyjayanthimala as Kamla 
 Om Prakash as Hakim Ram Prasad
 Nana Palsikar as Biharilal
 Tabassum as Biharilal's Wife
 Raj Mehra as Ratan
 Purnima as Janki
 Randhir as Kamla's Neighbour
 Achala Sachdev as Shyam's Mother
 Leela Mishra as Ramprasad's Sister
 Mohan Choti as Shyam's Friend

Production
The film marks the debut of Saroj Khan as the choreographer, she trained actress Vyjayanthimala. After the death of actor Shammi Kapoor in 2011, The Hindu interviewed actress Vyjayanthimala in conjunction with a tribute to actor Shammi Kapoor, she described the actor as "Whilst working in "College Girl", he adopted a peculiar way of walking on his toes, which he effectively created himself".

Soundtrack

Box office
At the end of its theatrical run, the film grossed around 70,00,000 with net collection of 35,00,000, thus becoming the eighteenth highest-grossing film of 1960. Box Office India gave it a verdict of "average".

References

External links
 
 College Girl profile at Upperstall.com

1960s Hindi-language films
1960 films
Indian black-and-white films
Indian romantic drama films
1960 romantic drama films
Films scored by Shankar–Jaikishan
Films directed by T. Prakash Rao